This is the list of the unofficial members of the Executive Council of Hong Kong (ExCo) from 1946 the reestablishment of the civil government of the British Hong Kong until the handover of Hong Kong to Chinese sovereignty in 1997. Information is generated from the Hong Kong government's annual reports.

Change in composition

List of the Unofficial Members of the Executive Council

See also
 List of Executive Council of Hong Kong unofficial members 1896–1941
 List of Legislative Council of Hong Kong unofficial members 1946–1985

References